Admiral Henry Craven St John (5 January 1837 – 21 May 1909) was a Royal Navy officer who became Senior Officer, Coast of Ireland Station.

Background
He was the son of Charles William George St John and the great-grandson of Frederick St John, 2nd Viscount Bolingbroke.

Naval career

On 12 April 1866 the Admiralty announced that Lieutenant St John, in command of her Majesty's gunboat   was promoted to Commander in consideration of the skill and judgement displayed in effecting the destruction of a large piratical force of 54 Chinese Junks, without loss in the attack and capture. 

St John became commanding officer of the sloop  in November 1873.

His memoir Notes and Sketches from the Wild Coasts of Nipon. With chapters of cruising after pirates in Chinese waters were published in 1880 by David Douglas, Edinburgh.

He was appointed commanding officer of the Central battery ship HMS Iron Duke in August 1885 and Senior Officer, Coast of Ireland Station in January 1892 before he retired in January 1895.

References

1837 births
1909 deaths
Royal Navy admirals